O'Connell Upper is a stop on the Luas light-rail tram system in Dublin, Ireland. It opened in 2017 as a stop on Luas Cross City, an extension of the Green Line through the city centre from St. Stephen's Green to Broombridge. It is located on O'Connell Street, and provides access to the Savoy Cinema.

Location
O'Connell Upper's single platform is located to the east of the tracks, integrated into the central reservation of O'Connell Street.  It is a stop on the one-way system at the centre of the green line.  Beyond the tracks there is a junction where trams either turn left, reuniting with the southbound track and continuing to Broombridge or right, turning to Parnell.

References

Luas Green Line stops in Dublin (city)
Railway stations opened in 2017
2017 establishments in Ireland
Railway stations in the Republic of Ireland opened in the 21st century